Mohican State Park is a  public recreation area located on the south shore of Pleasant Hill Lake,  south of Loudonville in Ashland County, Ohio, United States. The state park is located along Ohio SR 3 and Ohio SR 97 and is surrounded by the  Mohican-Memorial State Forest. The Clear Fork of the Mohican River flows through the park carving a narrow gorge and joins the Black Fork about a half-mile east of the park to form the Mohican River. The park is open for year-round recreation including camping, hiking, boating, mountain biking, fishing, and picnicking.

History
Mohican State Park was originally called Clear Fork State Park when the Ohio Department of Natural Resources was created in 1949 and the park was created from Ohio Division of Forestry lands. In 1966, the name of the park was changed to Mohican to alleviate confusion between Clear Fork Reservoir in Mansfield, Ohio and the state park.

Activities

Hiking
The designated mountain bike trails and bridle paths are also available for the hiker to use.

Mountain biking

An  mountain bike trail that passes through Mohican State Park and the state forest was opened to the public in 2005. The trail was created through a partnership between the Mohican/Malabar Bike Club and ODNR. The trail is open to mountain bike riders and hikers. Each June the park is home to the Mohican MTB 100 race.

Naturalist programs
From Memorial Day Weekend through the Sunday of Labor Day Weekend, the park offers daily naturalist activities for its camping and cottage visitors as well as the general public. Activities include movies at the Class A Campground amphitheater on weekends, nature hikes, family games, and grist mill tours. In addition, the Junior Naturalist program is offered for kids from ages 7 through 14.  A restored cabin served as the park Nature Center and was located in the Class A Campground. It was moved to the space where the game room used to reside.

Camping
There are three separate camping areas at Mohican State Park:  the Class A Campground, the Class B Campground, and the Group Camp Area. There is also the Mohican Resort and Conference Center, built in 1974 and operated by Xanterra Parks and Resorts.

References

External links

Mohican State Park Ohio Department of Natural Resources 
Mohican State Park Map Ohio Department of Natural Resources 
Mohican State Park Lodge and Conference Center Xanterra Parks & Resorts

Protected areas of Ashland County, Ohio
State parks of Ohio
Protected areas established in 1949
1949 establishments in Ohio